Lee's Lieutenants: A Study in Command is a three-volume work by Douglas Southall Freeman on the generals of the Army of Northern Virginia during the American Civil War.

1942 non-fiction books
Books about military history
Book series introduced in 1942
History books about the American Civil War